Hermanak (also Romanized as Ḩermānak and Hermānak; also known as Hermānak-e ‘Olyā and Khermānak) is a village in Chenarud-e Jonubi Rural District, Chenarud District, Chadegan County, Isfahan Province, Iran. At the 2006 census, its population was 216, in 35 families.

References 

Populated places in Chadegan County